"Don't Let the Feeling Go" is a song recorded by British house music group Nightcrawlers and released in August 1995 as the third single from their only album, Lets Push It (1995). The song is produced by American DJ and record producer MK, and written by John Reid with Kinchen and Graham Wilson. In the UK, it peaked at number 13 in its first week at the UK Singles Chart, on 9 September 1995. It became a hit also in other countries, such as Finland, where it peaked at number five and in Belgium, Ireland, Scotland, Sweden and Switzerland, where the single reached the top 30.

Critical reception
In his weekly UK chart commentary in Dotmusic, James Masterton noted, "With their third single the Nightcrawlers move further and further away from the pure dance they started with and into the realm of the proper pop single, pushing singer John Reid to the fore and producing a track which is danceable but is still enough of a song to make it into mainstream radio programming." Pan-European magazine Music & Media commented, "Do you wanna funk? Then push the feeling a little further and surrender to John Reid's third single in 1994, on which he goes back to Sylvester and Patrick Cowleys' kind of disco adapted to producer Kinchen's sound." 

Simon Sadler, head of music at Kiss 100FM/London was the first one to report a new Nightcrawlers single. He said, "On the one hand it's good as it prolongs a winning formula. On the other hand, I see it as their last chance to use the same old recipe again." A reviewer from Music Week gave it three out of five, adding that the singer "keeps to the formula which has provided two hits but, although the club and dub mixes are powerful floorfillers, it's unlikely to win much favour with radio programmers." James Hamilton from the RM Dance Update deemed it "another staccato stutterer, except this time also coherently chorused and whined".

Music video
A music video was produced to promote the single, directed by English film director Guy Ritchie. It features singer John Reid performing while driving a van. In the back, there is a party going on, with several people, and as Reid continues to sing, some of the people from the party comes out and sits next to him. In the middle of the video, he appears in the party, and when it ends, someone else is driving, while Reid sits in the middle of a crowd of people.

Track listings
 12" (MK & Tin Tin Out Mixes), UK
 "Don't Let the Feeling Go" (Tin Tin Out Vocal Mix)
 "Don't Let the Feeling Go" (Tooley Street Dub)
 "Don't Let the Feeling Go" (MK Club Mix)
 "Don't Let the Feeling Go" (MK Dub Mix)

 CD single, Europe
 "Don't Let the Feeling Go" (MK Radio Edit) — 3:53
 "Don't Let the Feeling Go" (MK Club Mix) — 7:32

 CD maxi (MK & Tin Tin Out Mixes), UK
 "Don't Let the Feeling Go" (Tin Tin Out Radio Edit) — 3:50
 "Don't Let the Feeling Go" (MK Radio Edit) — 3:49
 "Don't Let the Feeling Go" (Tin Tin Out Vocal Mix) — 6:47
 "Don't Let the Feeling Go" (MK Club Mix) — 7:31
 "Don't Let the Feeling Go" (Tooley Street Dub) — 7:04
 "Don't Let the Feeling Go" (MK Dub Mix) — 7:55

Charts

References

 

1995 singles
Nightcrawlers (band) songs
Songs written by Marc Kinchen
1995 songs